Neville Roy Singham (born May 13, 1954) is an American businessman and social activist. He is the founder and former chairman of ThoughtWorks, an IT consulting company that provides custom software, software tools, and consulting services.

Early life 
Singham's father was Archie Singham. In his youth, Singham was a member of the League of Revolutionary Black Workers, a Black nationalist–Maoist group, taking a job at a Chrysler plant in Detroit in 1972 as an activist in the group. He attended Howard University before starting a consulting firm for equipment-leasing companies from his Chicago home.

Career 
Singham founded ThoughtWorks, a Chicago-based IT consulting company that provides custom software, software tools, and consulting services, in the late 1980s; it was incorporated in 1993.

From 2001 to 2008, Singham was a strategic technical consultant for Huawei.

By 2008, ThoughtWorks employed 1,000 people and was growing at the rate of 20–30% p.a., with bases around the world. Its clients included Microsoft, Oracle, major banks, and The Guardian newspaper. Singham owned 97% of the common stock of the company. By 2010, its clients included Daimler AG, Siemens and Barclays, and had opened a second headquarters in Bangalore.

In 2010, he opened Thoughtworks' Fifth Agile Software Development Conference in Beijing, where he spoke about his influence on Huawei.

Singham sold the company to private equity firm Apax Partners in 2017, by which time it had 4,500 employees across 15 countries, including South Africa and Uganda. Its chief scientist, Martin Fowler, wrote that Singham had not been involved in the running of the business for some years by that time:"While I was surprised to hear that he was selling the company, the news was not unexpected. Over the last few years Roy has been increasingly involved in his activist work, and spending little time running ThoughtWorks. ... He's been able to do this because he's built a management team that's capable of running the company largely without him. But as I saw him spend more energy on his activist work, it was apparent it would be appealing to him to accelerate that activism with the money that selling ThoughtWorks would bring."

Singham has business interests in Chinese companies in the food and consultancy markets.

Ideas and positions
At ThoughtWorks, Singham was a pioneer of agile software development and has helped popularized Lean manufacturing, such as that used in the Toyota business model.

Singham opposes proprietary software development and supports open access and the Creative Commons movement. In 2008, Singham said, "As a socialist I believe the world should have access to the best ideas in software for free. My goal is a superior infrastructure to solve the world's problems." In the same interview, he described himself as a big fan of Venezuela's Hugo Chavez, describing the country under his rule as a "phenomenally democratic place." He also described his admiration for China, where ThoughtWorks had a growing operation, describing it as a model for governance: "China is teaching the West that the world is better off with a dual system of both free-market adjustments and long-term planning."

He is a supporter of WikiLeaks and its founder Julian Assange, for example speaking in his defence at a 2011 event hosted by the Real News Network, alongside fellow activist software businessman Peter Thiel and former intelligence whistleblower Daniel Ellsberg. Alongside Ellsberg, he has also advocated for hackers such as Jeremy Hammond and Aaron Swartz—the latter, a friend of Singham's, having worked for him at ThoughtWorks when he committed suicide while facing prosecution by the US government. Singham described Swartz's prosecution as "part of a coordinated campaign to scare young Internet activists" in the age of WikiLeaks.

In a 2013 interview, he advocated for Frugal innovation, describing ThoughtWorks' investments in such projects in India, Brazil and China.

Controversies 
The funds were alleged to have passed through a network of companies and NGOs including Delaware-based Worldwide Media Holdings (allegedly owned by Singham), and the Justice and Education Fund, GSPAN LLC and the Tricontinental Institute (which allegedly shared the same address) in the US, and Centro Popular Demidas, Brazil.

According to a January 2022 report by New Lines Magazine of the Newlines Institute, a think tank led by Hassan Hassan at the Fairfax University of America, Singham has financed a network of non-profit organizations who defend the Chinese government and are involved in denying the Uyghur genocide, channeling almost $65 million to a range of groups.

In a November 2022 report, Intelligence Online revealed Singham was discretely funneling money to various groups aimed at lobbying against any western support to Ukraine following Russia's invasion, under the guise of anti-war efforts.

Personal life 
Singham's wife is Code Pink's Jodie Evans. His son Nathan (Nate) Singham works for the Tricontinental: Institute for Social Research.

References 

 
 

1954 births
Living people
Businesspeople from Illinois
Place of birth missing (living people)
American computer businesspeople
American people of Sri Lankan descent